Shirehall is a municipal facility in Abbey Foregate, Shrewsbury, Shropshire. The building, which is the headquarters of Shropshire Council, is just north of Lord Hill's Column.

History
The building was commissioned to replace the Old Shirehall in Market Square. After deciding in the Old Shirehall was inadequate for their needs, county leaders decided to procure a new building: the site they selected had previously been occupied by a country house known as "Nearwell".

The foundation stone for the new building was laid by Sir Offley Wakeman, a former chairman of the county council, on 25 July 1964. It was designed by Ralph Crowe, the County Architect, in the Modernist style, built at a cost of £1.8 million and was completed in April 1966. It was officially opened by Queen Elizabeth II, accompanied by the Duke of Edinburgh, on 17 March 1967. The design for the six-storey building facing Abbey Foregate involved continuous bands of glazing with concrete panels above and below: it also included an unusual ovoid-shaped council chamber which jutted out to the south-west of the main building. The complex also included court facilities for the local assizes and quarter sessions. Pevsner described the building as "the major monument to post-war modernism in the county".

Originally established as the headquarters of Shropshire County Council, the building became the offices of the new unitary authority, Shropshire Council in April 2009. A scheme to refurbish the building at a cost of £24 million was proposed in December 2018. However, in September 2020, the council indicated that it would rather sell the building and move to the town centre. Then in October 2020, following an application for a certificate of immunity from listing requested by the county council, English Heritage decided not to list County Hall as the building did not meet the criteria for listing post-1945 buildings. In May 2021 the Twentieth Century Society placed the site on its Top 10 Buildings at Risk List.

Works of art in the building include a cast iron mural by Rosalind Alexander, located in the entrance hall, depicting Shropshire industries.

Notes

References

Buildings and structures in Shrewsbury
County halls in England
Government buildings completed in 1966